The Agreement on Succession Issues of the Former Socialist Federal Republic of Yugoslavia is an international agreement on shared state succession of the Socialist Federal Republic of Yugoslavia reached among its former constituents republics following the breakup of the country in early 1990's.

The agreement was reached in 2001, after the end of Yugoslav Wars and protracted negotiations facilitated by international community, that there are five sovereign equal successor states of the SFR Yugoslavia (Slovenia, Croatia, Bosnia and Herzegovina, The Former Yugoslav Republic of Macedonia – today North Macedonia — and the Federal Republic of Yugoslavia – today Serbia). It entered into force on 2 June 2004 when the last successor state (Croatia) ratified it. Contrary to some other cases in which only one country would act as a sole legal successor state (for example Russian Federation in case of USSR), multiple new states participated in state succession of SFR Yugoslavia with neither one of them therefore continuing in full international legal personality of the previous state or inheriting automatically memberships in multilateral institutions or treaties.

The agreement was signed as an umbrella agreement which included annexes on diplomatic and consular properties, financial assets and liabilities, archives, pensions, other rights, interests and liabilities as well as private properties and acquired rights. As of 2021 daily implementation of the Agreement remains only partial with significant differences in each annex and with particular challenges in restitution of cross-state immovable property rights for private companies and individuals (Annex G) particularly pronounced in restitution of private property rights in Croatia.

Background
While Slovenia, Croatia, Bosnia and Herzegovina and FYR Macedonia interpreted the breakup of Yugoslavia as a definite replacement of the earlier Yugoslav socialist federation with new sovereign equal successor states, newly established FR Yugoslavia (Serbia and Montenegro) claimed that it is sole legal successor entitled to the assets as well as automatic memberships in international organisations and agreements of SFR Yugoslavia. Arbitration Commission of the Peace Conference on Yugoslavia was established on 27 August 1991 providing a formal negotiating platform for the Yugoslav republics with the Commission declaring on 29 November 1991 that SFR Yugoslavia was in the process of a dissolution opening the doors for recognition of new states. On 12 February 1992 Serbia and Montenegro agreed to reconstitute their federation and on 27 April 1992 declared the formation the Federal Republic of Yugoslavia as the direct continuing state with full legal personality of the former SFR Yugoslavia. This interpretation was rejected by the European Community and the United States as well as any subsequent succession claims by subnational entities (Federation of Bosnia and Herzegovina, Republika Srpska or Republic of Serbian Krajina).

On 22 November 1995 United Nations Security Council adopted United Nations Security Council Resolution 1022 welcoming the efforts to reach consensual agreement on state succession that will enable transfer of assets to the new states.

See also
 Foreign relations of Yugoslavia
 Foreign relations of Serbia and Montenegro
 Foreign relations of Serbia
 Foreign relations of Montenegro
 Foreign relations of Croatia
 Foreign relations of Slovenia
 Foreign relations of Bosnia and Herzegovina
 Foreign relations of North Macedonia
 United Nations Security Council Resolution 777

References

Treaties of Croatia
Treaties of Slovenia
Treaties of Serbia
Treaties of Serbia and Montenegro
Treaties of Bosnia and Herzegovina
Treaties of North Macedonia
Breakup of Yugoslavia
Successor states
Treaties entered into force in 2004
Treaties concluded in 2001
2001 in Austria
Bosnia and Herzegovina–Serbia relations
Croatia–Serbia relations
North Macedonia–Serbia relations
Serbia–Slovenia relations
Bosnia and Herzegovina–Croatia relations
Bosnia and Herzegovina–Slovenia relations
Bosnia and Herzegovina–North Macedonia relations
Croatia–Slovenia relations
North Macedonia–Slovenia relations
Croatia–North Macedonia relations